Pseudofulvibacter geojedonensis is a Gram-negative, aerobic, rod-shaped, non-spore-forming and non-motile bacterium from the genus of Pseudofulvibacter. Pseudofulvibacter geojedonensis has been isolated from seawater from the South Sea in South Korea.

References

Flavobacteria
Bacteria described in 2013